The 2011 VFF Cup was the 8th season of the annual football tournament organised in Vietnam, took place on 19–23 October 2011.

Venue

Squads

Result

Goalscorers 
2 goals
  Baddrol Bakhtiar
  Pavel Smolyachenko
  Lê Hoàng Thiên
  Phạm Thành Lương

1 goal

  Mohd Fandi Othman
  Syahrul Azwari Ibrahim
  Kyaw Ko Ko
  Min Min Tun
  Otabek Valijonnov
  Abdukakhor Khodjiakbarov
  Oybek Kilichev
  Alisher Shagulyamov
  Chu Ngọc Anh
  Nguyễn Văn Quyết
  Nguyễn Trọng Hoàng

References

External links 
 

VFF Cup
VFF